Justin Franks, known professionally as DJ Frank E, is an American DJ and record producer from Denver, Colorado.

Frank E started working closely with Adelio Lombardi, founder of Side 3 Entertainment and owner of Side 3 Studios in Denver, while working his way up in the Denver club circuit as a DJ/remixer and as a member of the Radiobums DJ crew. He began focusing all of his free time on becoming a producer. In 2007, DJ Frank E submitted a track via PMP Worldwide, and was discovered by Mike Caren of Artist Publishing Group and Atlantic Records, who signed him in early 2008.

Since 2008, Frank E has produced songs for Flo Rida, Pitbull, Enrique Iglesias, Justin Bieber, Jason Derulo, Lecrae, Charlie Puth, The Vamps, Lil Wayne, G-Eazy, Ed Sheeran, Madonna, Kanye West, Plies, The Black Eyed Peas, Chris Brown, Travie McCoy, Sean Kingston, Toni Braxton, B.o.B, Sevyn Streeter, Three 6 Mafia, Leona Lewis, The Lonely Island, Wiz Khalifa, and many others.

Discography

References

Record producers from Colorado
American DJs
Living people
Year of birth missing (living people)